Emtricitabine/rilpivirine/tenofovir (trade names Complera, Eviplera) is a fixed-dose combination of antiretroviral drugs for the treatment of HIV/AIDS.  The drug was co-developed by Gilead Sciences and Johnson & Johnson's Tibotec division and was approved by the Food and Drug Administration in August 2011, and by the European Medicines Agency in November 2011, for patients who have not previously been treated for HIV.  It is available as a once-a-day single tablet.

In the European Union it is marketed as Eviplera and in the US as Complera.

Medical uses 

Emtricitabine/rilpivirine/tenofovir is indicated for treatment of HIV-1 in adults naïve to HIV-1 medications (where the virus has not developed resistance to these anti-HIV medications) and who have no more than 100,000 copies per mL of HIV-1 RNA in their blood (“viral load”).

Side effects 

Common
 Diarrhea
 Nausea
 Vomiting
 Insomnia
 Abnormal dreams
 Dizziness
 Headache
 Rash
 Weakness
 Decreased appetite

Serious
 Lactic acidosis (excess lactic acid in blood) is a rare and potentially fatal side effect. It is characterized by the following symptoms: deep and rapid breathing, tiredness or weakness, nausea, vomiting, abnormal muscle pain, dizziness or drowsiness
 Serious liver problems, such as hepatomegaly (enlarged liver) and steatosis (fatty liver). Presentation typically includes: skin or the white part of the eyes turning yellow (jaundice), dark “tea-colored” urine, light-colored bowel movements, loss of appetite, nausea, stomach pain
 Worsening of hepatitis B (HBV) infection. Patients also diagnosed with HBV who stop taking Emtricitabine/rilpivirine/tenofovir may suddenly exacerbate their hepatitis.
 New or worsening kidney problems, including kidney failure
 Onset of depressive disorders or mood changes
 Changes in bone such as osteonecrosis (breakdown and death of bone)
 Increases or redistribution of body fat
 Immune system changes (e.g. Immune Reconstitution Syndrome)

Interactions 

Contraindications

Use of emtricitabine/rilpivirine/tenofovir with the following medicines is contraindicated, as they lead to reduced blood levels of rilpivirine and in turn reduce the effectiveness of emtricitabine/rilpivirine/tenofovir:
 carbamazepine, oxcarbazepine, phenobarbital, phenytoin
 rifampicin, rifapentine
 omeprazole, esomeprazole, lansoprazole, pantoprazole, rabeprazole
 systemic dexamethasone (more than a single dose)
 St John's wort

References

External links 
 
 

Fixed dose combination (antiretroviral)
Gilead Sciences
Hepatotoxins
Johnson & Johnson brands